The 1954–55 season was Real Madrid Club de Fútbol's 52nd season in existence and the club's 24th consecutive season in the top flight of Spanish football.

Summary
The club won the second league championship in a row despite changes on the bench: a young Villalonga who was appointed manager of Real Madrid in the middle of the season replacing Enrique Fernandez Viola. Meanwhile, it was a great campaign for Francisco Gento and the club acquired Argentine Héctor Rial from the Nacional Montevideo, an arrival to boost the offensive line. Argentine forward Alfredo Di Stéfano scored 25 goals playing another superb season. After its fourth ever league win (second in a row), the team proceeded to clinch the Latin Cup in June. However, in the Copa del Generalísimo, without Di Stéfano (who still had not obtained his Spanish citizenship), Madrid were knocked out in the semi-finals by Sevilla. Also, winning the domestic title gave Real Madrid the right to participate in the inaugural 1955–56 European Cup season.

Squad

Transfers

Competitions

La Liga

League table

Results by round

Matches

Copa del Generalísimo

Quarter-finals

Semi-finals

Latin Cup

Final

Statistics

Squad statistics

Squad

Players statistics

References

Real Madrid CF seasons
Real Madrid CF
Spanish football championship-winning seasons